Bicolorana is a genus of bush crickets in the subfamily Tettigoniinae and tribe Platycleidini. Species can be found in many parts of mainland Europe (but not the British Isles, Iberia or most of Scandinavia), through central Asia to the Korean peninsula.

Species
The Orthoptera Species File lists the following:
Bicolorana bicolor Philippi, 1830 - type species (as Locusta bicolor Philippi = Bicolorana bicolor bicolor)
Bicolorana burri Uvarov, 1921
Bicolorana kuntzeni Ramme, 1931

Moved species
The Catalogue of Life has listed species names that are now placed in the genus Roeseliana:
"Bicolorana ambitiosa"
B. bispina
B. fedtschenkoi
B. pylnovi
B. roeselii (Roesel's bush cricket)

Gallery

References

External links

Orthoptera genera
Tettigoniidae